Anatrachyntis coridophaga is a moth in the family Cosmopterigidae. It is found in Egypt and Libya.

The wingspan is about 9 mm. Adults have been recorded on wing in April, July and October.

The larvae feed on the buds of Hibiscus species.

References

Moths described in 1925
Anatrachyntis
Moths of Africa